Lamine Diack (7 June 1933 – 3 December 2021) was a Senegalese businessman, sports administrator, and athlete. He was president of the International Association of Athletics Federations (IAAF) from 1999 to 2015. He was the subject of numerous investigations into corruption during his tenure as president.  He was also a member of the International Olympic Committee (IOC) from 1999 to 2013, then an honorary member from 2014 to 2015, and the chairman of the National Water Company "Société Nationale des Eaux" of Senegal (SONES) from 1995 to 2001. He had been under house arrest from November 2015, and his trial in France started in June 2020. On 16 September 2020 Diack, his son Papa Massata Diack, the head of the IAAF anti-doping department Gabriel Dolle, and other persons were given prison sentences for their part in a coverup of doping in Russia.

Athlete
Diack was a champion long jumper in the late 1950s, winning the event at the 1958 French Athletics Championships and holding the French/West African record from 1957 to 1960.

International Association of Athletics Federations (IAAF)
Diack became president of the International Association of Athletics Federations (IAAF) on 8 November 1999, and was re-elected for his fourth and final four-year term on 16 October 2011. He was also a member of the International Olympic Committee (IOC).

Corruption

In 2011 the ethics committee of the IOC conducted a year long investigation into claims that Diack had received bribes from the bankrupt sports marketing company International Sport and Leisure (ISL). Diack received three payments in 1993 from ISL at a time when the company was in negotiations with the IAAF to sign a marketing contract. The IOC described Diack as having "placed himself in a conflict of interest situation". Diack claimed that he received the money from supporters after his house burned down. Diack was warned for his behaviour, with the fact that he was not a member of IOC at the time of the wrongdoing considered a mitigating factor.

In November 2015, Diack and several other top IAAF officials were arrested in France and charged with "passive corruption" and money laundering by French financial prosecutors. Diack was placed under house arrest in Paris and Gabriel Dollé, the former anti-doping manager at the IAAF, was taken into custody in Nice. The IOC provisionally suspended Diack, and he resigned his position as an IOC Honorary Member.

In 2016, the World Anti-Doping Agency reported that with his influence, Diack was able to install two of his sons and a friend into positions that exerted influence over the IAAF. The report says that Lamine Diack "was responsible for organizing and enabling the conspiracy and corruption that took place in the IAAF." In 2018, Diack was handed an additional charge of "breach of trust" by French prosecutors. 

On 18 June 2020, the trial of Diack and five other people, including his son, concluded. Diack was sentenced to jail for four years, two of them suspended.

Honours
He was awarded with the Grand-Cordon of the Order of the Rising Sun of Japan in 2007.

Death
Diack died on 3 December 2021, at the age of 88.

References

External links

 IAAF profile

1933 births
2021 deaths
Senegalese male long jumpers
International Olympic Committee members
Athletics (track and field) administrators
Sports executives and administrators
Recipients of the Olympic Order
Grand Cordons of the Order of the Rising Sun
Presidents of the International Association of Athletics Federations
Sportspeople convicted of crimes
Sportspeople from Dakar
Mayors of Dakar
Senegal national football team managers
Senegalese football managers